Crowdspring (written "crowdSPRING", legally crowdSPRING, LLC) is an online marketplace for crowdsourced creative services.

Overview
Crowdspring was co-founded in May 2007 by Ross Kimbarovsky and Michael Samson. Crowdspring launched its online marketplace publicly in May 2008. Crowdspring is based in Chicago.

More than 200,000 graphic designers and writers from 200 countries work on Crowdspring.

Blog 
Crowdspring maintains a blog which was launched in mid-2008.

Criticism
When it launched publicly in mid-2008, the company and its business model received some criticism because Crowdspring's marketplace works on a speculative model and challenges traditional ways of buying and selling graphic design, industrial design, and copywriting services. This is the process of asking professionals to complete custom work for the chance of getting payment. This means that most people involved in the process effectively work for free. Crowdspring embraced and actively participates in the debate about its spec work business model.

References

Further reading
 Social Media Marketing: The Next Generation of Business Engagement. John Wiley & Sons. pp. pt232–233.
 Twitterville: How Businesses Can Thrive in the New Global Neighborhoods. Penguin. pp. pt.110–111
 Information Week
 Chicago Tribune
 Information Week

External links 
Crowdspring website

Design companies of the United States
Companies based in Chicago
Online marketplaces of the United States
Privately held companies based in Illinois
Graphic design